Trouble was released in 1991 and was produced, written and performed by Miami-based musician Michael Sterling.

Tracks

One More Chance was a megahit back in the 90's and Lovers and Friends was heavily sampled by R&B singer Usher and Atlanta rappers Ludacris and Lil Jon in 2004. Trouble was re-released in 2007.

References

1991 albums